Sonwarsa Halt railway station is a halt railway station on Gaya–Kiul line of Delhi–Kolkata Main Line in East Central Railway zone under Danapur railway division of the Indian Railways. The railway station is situated beside Warisaliganj-Kashichak Road, Gamhirpur Sonbarsa in Nawada district in the Indian state of Bihar.

References 

Railway stations in Nawada district
Danapur railway division
Railway stations in India opened in 1879